"You Was Right" is a song recorded by American rapper Lil Uzi Vert. It was released as a single for their third mixtape Lil Uzi Vert vs. the World on May 27, 2016, by Generation Now and Atlantic Records.

Background 
"You Was Right" received over 45 million streams on SoundCloud in the period of six months. Included in Lil Uzi Vert vs. the World as the fifth track, the song peaked on the Billboard Hot 100 at number 40.

Commercial performance 
The song has sold more than two million copies in the United States and was certified double-platinum by Recording Industry Association of America (RIAA) on February 26, 2018. It was previously, in 2017, certified gold and platinum on January 6 and March 2, respectively. "You Was Right" is Uzi Vert's first solo single to be certified platinum in the United States, with their second platinum-certified solo single appearing three weeks later.

Music video 
The official music video was released on October 5, 2016. Based on Alice's Adventures in Wonderland, it features Lil Uzi Vert and Metro Boomin as Mad Hatters in a tea party, with the latter handling an MPC. It was directed by Spike Jordan, showing Uzi Vert walking into a door that transforms their reality into a fantasy, in which bunnies are shown hopping around and beautiful women with "some hypnotic eyes strolling in their fuzzy Puma slippers in a tea party picnic filled with stacks of cash." As noted by Complex, in the video Uzi Vert walks into a "chandelier-filled mansion with lovestruck women following [them] around." Uzi Vert's then-partner Brittany Byrd was among the women in the video.

On May 9, 2017, an animated music video, produced by SomeHoodlum, was released to YouTube with the length of a minute. It was described by The Fader as a "trippy cartoon" which features Uzi Vert "riding [their] four-wheeler down a street and off a cliff" alongside Boomin.

Personnel 
Credits adapted from Tidal.

 Metro Boomin – producer, programmer, songwriter
 Lil Uzi Vert – primary artist, songwriter
 Chris Athens – mastering
 Kesha "K. Lee" Lee – mixing, recording

Charts

Weekly charts

Year-end charts

Certifications

References 

2016 singles
2016 songs
Lil Uzi Vert songs
Songs written by Lil Uzi Vert
Songs written by Metro Boomin
Trap music songs